Lordiphosa is a genus of fly in the family Drosophilidae.

Species
L. acongruens (Zhang & Liang, 1992)
L. acuminata (Collin, 1952)
L. alticola Hu, Watabe & Toda, 1999
L. andalusiaca (Strobl, 1906)
L. antillaria (Okada, 1984)
L. archoroides (Zhang, 1993)
L. baechlii Zhang, 2008
L. basdeni (Wheeler, 1957)
L. biconvexa (Zhang & Liang, 1992)
L. chaoi Hu & Toda, 1999
L. chaolipinga (Okada, 1984)
L. clarofinis (Lee, 1959)
L. coei (Okada, 1966)
L. collinella (Okada, 1968)
L. cultrata Zhang, 1993
L. denticeps (Okada & Sasakawa, 1956)
L. deqenensis Zhang, 1993
L. eminens Quan & Zhang, 2003
L. falsiramula Zhang, 1993
L. fenestrarum (Fallén, 1823)
L. gruicollara Quan & Zhang, 2003
L. harpophallata Hu, Watabe & Toda, 1999
L. hexasticha (Papp, 1971)
L. himalayana (Gupta & Gupta, 1991)
L. hirsuta (Duda, 1926)
L. incidens Quan & Zhang, 2003
L. kurokawai (Okada, 1971)
L. ludianensis Quan & Zhang, 2001
L. macai Zhang, 2008
L. megalopectinata (Takada, Makino, Momma & Suzuki, 1953)
L. miki (Duda, 1924)
L. mommai (Takada & (Okada, 1960)
L. neokurokawai (Singh & Gupta, 1981)
L. nigricolor (Strobl, 1898)
L. nigrifemur Quan & Zhang, 2001
L. nigrocolor (Patterson & Wheeler, 1949)
L. nigrostyla (Okada, 1988)
L. paradenticeps (Okada, 1971)
L. paraflabella Gupta & De, 1996
L. parantillaria (Kumar & Gupta, 1990)
L. penicilla (Zhang, 1993)
L. penicula (Okada, 1984)
L. peniglobosa (Kumar & Gupta, 1990)
L. piliferous Quan & Zhang, 2003
L. porrecta (Okada, 1984)
L. protrusa (Zhang & Liang, 1992)
L. ramipara (Zhang & Liang, 1992)
L. ramosissima (Zhang & Liang, 1992)
L. ramula Zhang, 1993
L. ripa (Okada, 1966)
L. serriflabella (Okada, 1966)
L. shennongjiana Hu & Toda, 1999
L. shii Quan & Zhang, 2001
L. spinopenicula (Okada, 1988)
L. stackelbergi (Duda, 1935)
L. subantillaria (Okada, 1984)
L. tripartita (Okada, 1966)
L. tsacasi Zhang, 2008
L. variopicta (Becker, 1908)
L. vittata Zhang & Liang, 1994
L. zonaria (Okada, 1966)

References

Drosophilidae
Muscomorph flies of Europe